Ellena is a surname. Notable people with the surname include:

 Jack Ellena, (born 1931), American football player
 Eric Elléna (fl. 2000s–2010s), French filmmaker
 Greg Ellena (fl. 1980s), baseball player
 Jean-Claude Ellena (born 1947), French perfumer
 Richard Ellena (born 1951), Anglican Bishop of the Diocese of Nelson

See also 
 Elena (disambiguation)